Tomasz Popielarski, better known as  Arctic Moon (born ) is a Polish DJ and music producer who hails from Szczecin, Poland. In 2012 and in 2013, he ranked in the DJ Mag top 200 DJs in the world. Armin van Buuren used Arctic Moon's remixed track "Coming Home" for the remix version of the album titled "Intense - The More Intense Edition."

Biography 
Thomas Popielarski started producing music in late 2003 and in 2004, he began to produce dance/hard dance music under the alias of East-NRG System.

In 2007, he focused on creating uplifting and euphoric trance music encompassing elements of classical, new age, chill-out and rock music.

Arctic Moon later became synonymous with labels such as Armada Music and Aly & Fila's Future Sound of Egypt Recordings internet radio show. He released singles "True Romance" and "Adelaide" on the latter label. The tracks peaked on download charts and gained large support from other DJs.

Arctic Moon has also remixed Aly & Fila's vocal trance track "It Will Be OK", Dash Berlin's single "Till the Sky Falls Down" and Vast Vision's "Ambrosia". His other remixes were featured on labels such as Blue Soho and Arisa Audio.

Discography 
Albums
 2008 Energy Reflect vs. Arctic Moon - Cold Planet

Singles
 2008 Overnight
 2009 Afterworld
 2009 Arctic Moon and Truewave - On Silver Wings
 2010 True Romance
 2011 Adelaide
 2012 Starships Over Alice
 2013 Arctic Moon and Paul Webster - Valhalla
 2013 Arctic Moon and Bryan Kearney - Dreamers & Dreams
 2014 RAM and Arctic Moon - Mirakuru
 2014 Arctic Moon feat. Noire Lee - Revolution
 2015 Into The Dusk
 2015 Arctic Moon and Apple One featuring Diana Leah - Who We Are
 2016 Data Ghost
 2016 Serein
 2016 We Burn Like Stars
 2016 Neon Nights 
 2017 Cyberpunk 
 2017 Nocturnal Horizons 
 2017 RAM and Arctic Moon with Stine Grove - A Billion Stars Above 
 2017 Arctic Moon and Purple Stories - Shadow Particles
 2018 Dragonborn
 2018 Digital Voices
 2018 Annihilation
 2019 About You
 2019 Arctic Moon featuring Shuba - Cool in My Disaster
 2019 Quantum Realm
 2020 Faded Atoms
 2020 RAM and Arctic Moon - Punkstars
 2020 Arctic Moon featuring Jessica Lawrence - Like the Sun
 2021 Arctic Moon & Bruno Oloviani - Fractal Wave
 2021 Arctic Moon & Bruno Oloviani - Galactica
 2021 Arctic Moon & Shortwave - Endless Shadows
 2021 The Great Unknown
 2022 Arctic Moon & Parnassvs - Become Human

References

External links 
 

Polish record producers
Polish DJs
Polish trance musicians
Musicians from Szczecin
1988 births
Living people